Lasse Staw (born 1 January 1988) is a former Norwegian footballer. He has played for Fredrikstad, Syrianska, Lillestrøm, Aalesund and Bodø/Glimt.

Career

Club career
Staw made his debut in the very last match of the 2004 season against Viking. In the 2006 season he made several appearances, and did things very well. He has played for several minor clubs before he went to Fredrikstad.

On 24 March 2012 it was announced that Staw had signed with Allsvenskan club Syrianska FC. He joined Lillestrøm on a half-year contract in August 2012, as the club wanted another goalkeeper as their first-choice goalkeeper Stefán Logi Magnússon was injured for the rest of the season.

Career statistics

References

External links
 Guardian Football

1988 births
Living people
Norwegian footballers
Norway under-21 international footballers
Fredrikstad FK players
Syrianska FC players
Lillestrøm SK players
Aalesunds FK players
FK Bodø/Glimt players
Eliteserien players
Norwegian First Division players
Allsvenskan players
Norwegian expatriate footballers
Expatriate footballers in Sweden
Norwegian expatriate sportspeople in Sweden
Association football goalkeepers
Sportspeople from Viken (county)